Lubu is a Malayic language spoken by the Lubu people on the island of Sumatra in Indonesia. It is surrounded by speakers of Batak Mandailing.

References

Languages of Indonesia

Malayic languages